Muhammad Ali Khan Saif belongs to Swabi, Khyber Pakhtunkhwa, He is a Pakistani politician who had been a member of Senate of Pakistan, from March 2015 to March 2021. He served as Federal Minister for tourism, and Youth Affairs from November 2007 to March 2008 in the caretaker federal cabinet of Prime Minister Muhammad Mian Soomro.

Education
He completed his LLB (Honors) from the University of Buckingham in 1991 and LLM in Human Rights Law from the University of Essex in 1993. In 1995, he received LL.M in International Law from the University of London.

In addition, he also holds two PhDs, one from the University of Wales in Law, and another from Quaid-e-Azam University in Anthropology (Suicide Terrorism). Besides, he is a doctoral candidate at the University of Halle, Germany in South Asian Studies.

Political career
In November 2007, he was inducted into the caretaker federal cabinet of Prime Minister Muhammad Mian Soomro and was appointed as Federal Minister for Tourism with the additional ministerial portfolio of Youth Affairs. He served as Minister for tourism, and youth affairs until 25 March 2008.

He was elected to the Senate of Pakistan as a candidate of Muttahida Qaumi Movement in 2015 Pakistani Senate election.
He retired on 11 March 2021 as a member of the senate of Pakistan upon his completion of 6 year term.

References

Living people
Pakistani senators (14th Parliament)
Pakistani barristers
Federal ministers of Pakistan
Alumni of the University of Essex
Alumni of the University of London
Alumni of the University of Buckingham
Year of birth missing (living people)
Government of Khyber Pakhtunkhwa